An arabesque is a type of music which uses melodies to create the atmosphere of Arabic architecture. The term and themes are borrowed from the art term arabesque, rather than stemming from Arabic music.  It is a highly ornamented style.

Notable arabesques

The most well-known are Claude Debussy's Deux Arabesques, composed in 1888 and 1891, respectively. 

Other composers who have written arabesques include:
 Marin Marais: L'arabesque (1717), appears in the soundtrack of the film Tous les Matins du Monde
 Robert Schumann: Arabeske in C, Op. 18 (1839)
 Johann Friedrich Franz Burgmüller (1806-1874): Op. 100 (1852)
 Hans von Bülow: Arabesques sur un thême de l’opéra Rigoletto (1853)
 Moritz Moszkowski: Opp. 15/2 (1877), 61 (1899), 95/4 and 96/5(1920)
 Enrique Granados: Arabesca, Op. 31, H. 142 (1890)
 Cécile Chaminade: Opp. 61 (1892) and 92 (1898)
 Pyotr Ilyich Tchaikovsky (1840-93)
 Anton Arensky: Op. 67 (1903)
 Adolf Schulz-Evler: Op. 12 Arabesques on "An der schönen blauen Donau"(1904)
 Edward MacDowell (1860-1908)
 Louis Vierne: Arabesque, Op. 31/15 (1913-4)
 Jean Sibelius: Arabesque, Op. 76/9 (1914)
 Bohuslav Martinů: Seven Arabesques for cello and piano (1931)
 Edward Joseph Collins: Arabesque for violin and piano (1933)
 William Kroll: Arabesque for violin and piano (1945) and for orchestra
 Harold Budd: Arabesque 1, 2 & 3 (2005)
 Samuel Hazo: Arabesque (2008)
 Sigfrid Karg-Elert: Arabeske no.1 in G flat major Op.5 'Filigran'

See also 
Arabesque (Turkish music)

References 

Classical music styles